is a former Japanese football player.

Playing career
Mitsuoka was born in Kanagawa Prefecture on April 22, 1976. After graduating from high school, he joined his local club Yokohama Flügels in 1995. On April 26, he debuted against Gamba Osaka. In this match, he scored an opening goal in the 2nd minute. After the debut, he played as forward and offensive midfielder. In 1997, the club won the 2nd place in Emperor's Cup. In 1998, he moved to Kyoto Purple Sanga. He played many matches as forward. However he hurt his knee and he could not play at all in the match after that. In 2001, he moved to J2 League club Vegalta Sendai. He played many matches as substitute and the club won the champions in 2001. Although the club was promoted to J1 League from 2002, his opportunity to play decreased. In 2003, he moved to Football League club Sagawa Express Tokyo. However he could hardly play in the match and he retired end of 2003 season.

Club statistics

References

External links

1976 births
Living people
Association football people from Kanagawa Prefecture
Japanese footballers
J1 League players
J2 League players
Japan Football League players
Yokohama Flügels players
Kyoto Sanga FC players
Vegalta Sendai players
Sagawa Shiga FC players
Association football forwards